Menno Oosting and Libor Pimek were the defending champions but they competed with different partners that year, Oosting with David Adams and Pimek with Peter Nyborg.

Adams and Oosting lost in the first round to Patrik Fredriksson and Kenny Thorne, as did Nyborg and Pimek to Saša Hiršzon and Goran Ivanišević.

Hirszon and Ivanišević won in the final 6–4, 6–3 against Brent Haygarth and Mark Keil.

Seeds

  David Adams /  Menno Oosting (first round)
  Peter Nyborg /  Libor Pimek (first round)
  Sjeng Schalken /  Jan Siemerink (semifinals)
  Donald Johnson /  Francisco Montana (first round)

Draw

References
 1997 Croatian Indoors Doubles Draw

Zagreb Indoors
1997 ATP Tour
1997 in Croatian tennis